Mir Kandi (also Romanized as Mīr Kandī) is a village in Meshgin-e Gharbi Rural District, in the Central District of Meshgin Shahr County, Ardabil Province, Iran. At the 2006 census, its population was 838, in 200 families.

References 

Tageo

Towns and villages in Meshgin Shahr County